Lupinus villosus, commonly known as lady lupine, pink sandhill lupine, or hairy lupine, is a flowering plant species in the genus Lupinus.

Description
The species has pink flowers and a deep taproot that makes it difficult to grow commercially. It is a perennial dicot and attracts butterflies and hummingbirds. The leaves are densely covered with silver hairs.

Distribution and habitat
It  grows in parts of Florida and the Southeastern United States in well drained sandy habitats.

References

villosus